Alkrington Garden Village is a suburban area of Middleton, in the Metropolitan Borough of Rochdale, Greater Manchester England.

Historically a part of Lancashire, in the Middle Ages Alkrington was a township in the parish of Prestwich-cum-Oldham in the hundred of Salford. Once rolling farmland, in 1886 Alkrington was added to the Municipal Borough of Middleton, and developed into a residential area.

Alkrington lies on the northern edge of the city of Manchester with the suburb of Blackley directly  to the south. The Local Government Act 1972 added Alkrington to the Metropolitan Borough of Rochdale; though Alkrington is separated from the town of Rochdale by the rest of Middleton and rural land.

The “Woodside” district of Alkrington is home to a number of  affluent properties  with Woodfield Road, Middleton's most expensive street, being located here.

History
In 1212, the manor of Alkrington, consisting of four oxgangs of land, was held by Adam de Prestwich from the Montbegon fee. About 20 years later it passed to the de Lacys, and subsequently to the Crown; but the manor continued to descend with the Prestwich family. In 1561 Sir Robert Langley gave the manor to his daughter Katherine who was married to Thomas Legh of Lyme and it was sold by the Leghs in 1627 to Robert and John Lever. Sir Darcy Lever, was High Sheriff of Lancashire in 1736. Sir Ashton Lever, who was high sheriff in 1771, collected curiosities which he exhibited at Alkrington Hall. He was succeeded by his brother whose younger son, John lived at Alkrington until 1834 and then to Dorning Rasbotham who sold it to John Lees.

Alkrington Hall

The Grade II* listed Alkrington Hall has been converted into flats. It was built between 1735–6 to the designs of Giacomo Leoni for Darcy Lever. The three-storey house is mainly brick built with ashlar dressings and tile and slate roofs. Its Classical style facade has nine bays with single-storey three-bay wings either side. The central three bays project slightly and have giant Ionic pilasters above the rusticated stone ground floor.

The woodland around Alkrington Hall comprises 125 acres (50 ha) and is a designated Local Nature Reserve.

The remains of an earlier hall can be seen on the site. The manor of Alkrington was bought by the Lever family in the 1600s but when the last family member died childless the estate and present hall were sold. The new owners sold on most of the land and the hall came into the possession of the local council who converted it to flats. The hall was later resold into private hands and converted into four luxury homes.

Geography

The area of Alkrington township was 797 acres. The underlying geology is that of the Lancashire Coalfield. The highest ground, 350 feet above sea level in the south-east and north east but mostly above 300 feet, slopes downwards to the boundary brooks in the south west. The main road that serves Alkrington is the A664 from Manchester via Blackley to Middleton. Junction 20 of the M60 motorway is to the south-west.

Religion
There are three churches within the old township area. The Anglican Church of St Michael was founded in 1839, a Congregational church was built in 1929 and the Roman Catholic St Thomas More Church was built in 1960.

Notable people
The comedian Steve Coogan was born and brought up in Alkrington, as were all four members of the band, The Courteeners. Comedian Bernard Manning lived in the area for more than 20 years. Manchester City's assistant manager, Brian Kidd resides in Alkrington, while former player Nedum Onuoha owns a home in the area. Retired footballer Ashley Ward was also born and brought up in Alkrington.

See also

Grade II* listed buildings in Greater Manchester
Listed buildings in Middleton, Greater Manchester

References

Country houses in Greater Manchester
Areas of Greater Manchester
Palladian architecture
Middleton, Greater Manchester
Local Nature Reserves in Greater Manchester